Grape Bay Ltd v Attorney-General of Bermuda [1999] UKPC 43 is a case concerning expressly analogous principles to compulsory purchase by the Privy Council and is important for English land law.  It directly concerns a state prohibition which impacts on a development, by agreement but not in any substantive physical works, underway. It held that an Act passed by the Bermuda legislature to prevent foreign corporation restaurants opening (including McDonald's) did not amount to a "regulatory taking" or an unconstitutional deprivation of property without compensation. In doing so, Lord Hoffmann distinguished infringement of "liberty" and an infringement of "property" in a manner similar to Wesley Newcomb Hohfeld's classic analysis.

Facts
McDonald's attempted to open a new branch in Bermuda, under the company name of Grape Bay Ltd. Residents objected, and a Bill was brought in the lower house to prohibit new foreign restaurants. It was defeated in the Senate, but a second reading came. McDonald's was keen to press ahead, and prepared to challenge it as being unconstitutional. It passed as the Governor signed the Prohibited Restaurant Act 1997 stopping any non-Bermudan restaurant that was not already established from being set up. McDonald's made a challenge under articles 1(c) and 13 of the Bermudan Constitution, alleging that it had been deprived of property without compensation. It contended that although it owned no land in Bermuda yet, the various contracts and options it had entered into amounted to a "chose in action" that was being displaced (devalued) by the Act. The general right of property in article 13 is not taken, but the more general reference in article 1(c) to "protection for the privacy of his home and other property and from deprivation of property without compensation" was enough to cover their position.

Advice
Lord Hoffmann advised that there was no deprivation of property, and so no breach of the Bermuda constitution.
He considered similar provisions from the constitutions of Dominica, Mauritius, and Malta where there is a family resemblance under many UK Overseas Territories, stating a general principle and then more specific rights. However it was unnecessary to decide whether more general declaratory rights were capable of enforcement in each situation because the act was not a deprivation of property in any case. His Lordship began his advice as follows.

See also

English land law
UK administrative law
WN Hohfeld
Claim rights and liberty rights

Notes

References

English land case law
United Kingdom administrative case law
1999 in British law
1999 in case law
Judicial Committee of the Privy Council cases on appeal from Bermuda
1999 in Bermuda